HNN may refer to:
 HLN (TV channel), an American television news channel
 HNN extension, in combinatorial group theory
 Hanunó'o language, spoken in the Philippines
 Hawaii News Now, a television program
 History News Network, a project of George Washington University
 HNN, Henderson VORTAC, located near Henderson, West Virginia.